Seget is a Papuan language of the Bird's Head Peninsula of New Guinea. It is spoken southwest of Sorong, in Walian, Sailolof, Segum, and Seget villages in Sorong Regency, West Papua. Walian and Sailolof are villages (kampung) located in Salawati. Seget and Segun are currently districts in Sorong Regency.

References

Languages of western New Guinea
West Bird's Head languages